Daniel "Dan" Simon Kalman (born March 21, 1952 in Oakland, California) is an American mathematician and winner of nine awards for expository writing in mathematics.

Education and career
After graduating from Oakland High School in 1970, Kalman matriculated at Harvey Mudd College, where he graduated in 1974. From 1974 to 1980 he was a graduate student at the University of Wisconsin–Madison, where he received his PhD in 1980. He was from 1978 to 1979 an instructor at Lawrence University in Appleton, Wisconsin, and from 1979 to 1983 an assistant professor at the University of Wisconsin–Green Bay. After teaching as a visiting lecturer from 1983 to 1985 at Augustana College in Sioux Falls, South Dakota, Kalman worked from 1985 to 1993 as a member of the technical staff of The Aerospace Corporation in Los Angeles. At Washington, D.C.'s American University he was from 1993 to 1998 an assistant professor, from 1998 to 2003 an associate professor, and from 2003 to 2018 a full professor, retiring in 2018 as professor emeritus. From 1996 to 1997 he was Associate Executive Director of the Mathematical Association of America (MAA) in Washington, D.C.

The MAA has given Kalman nine awards for outstanding expository articles or books. He won the George Pólya Award in 1994 and in 2003, the Trevor Evans Award in 1997 and (with coauthor Nathan Carter) in 2012, the Carl B. Allendoerfer Award (with coauthors Robert Mena and Shariar Shariari) in 1998 and (alone) in 2003, the Lester R. Ford Award in 2009 and (with coauthor Mark McKinzie) in 2013, and the Beckenbach Book Prize in 2012.

Selected publications

Articles
 
  (1994 George Polya Award, independently awarded to Charles Groetsch in the same year)
  (over 450 citations)
 with Robert Mena and Shahriar Shahriari: 
 with James White: 
 
 
 
 with Jane Day:  
 
 with James White: 
 
  (2003 George Pólya Award)
 with Robert Mena:  (over 230 citations)
 
 
 

 
  (2009 Lester R. Ford Award)
 
  (slides from a talk)
 
 with Mark McKinzie:

Books
 
 with Sacha Forgoston and Albert Goetz: 
  (2012 Beckenbach Book Prize)

References

External links

 

1952 births
Living people
20th-century American mathematicians
21st-century American mathematicians
Harvey Mudd College alumni
University of Wisconsin–Madison alumni
American University faculty and staff